Benton Academy is an independent, co-educational college preparatory school in Benton, Mississippi (United States). It is a member of the Mississippi Association of Independent Schools. It was founded as a segregation academy in 1969, and still did not enroll a single black student as of 2010. The school is located in Yazoo County, Mississippi.

History
Benton Academy was founded in 1969 as a segregation academy in response to the court ordered racial desegregation of public schools.
 The school opened in January 1970 in the middle of the school year.

In 1977, the NAACP called for the principal of Benton High School to resign since he was perceived to condone segregation by sending his children to Benton Academy.

When the school opened in 1969, it enrolled 460 students, but attendance fall to about 210 students in the 1970s and 1980s. In the early 1990s, the headmaster looked forwards to increasing enrollment after the opening of the Yazoo City federal prison.

Demographics
For the 20192020 school year, the school enrolled 216 students in grades PK-12, all of whom were white.

Athletics
Benton Academy athletic teams compete in the Mississippi Association of Independent Schools league.

Notable alumni
 Ben Beckwith, football player
 Wes Shivers, Class of 1995 – Former NFL offensive lineman and MMA fighter.

See also

List of Private Schools in Mississippi

References

External links

Private high schools in Mississippi
Schools in Yazoo County, Mississippi
Private middle schools in Mississippi
Private elementary schools in Mississippi
Segregation academies in Mississippi
Educational institutions established in 1969
1969 establishments in Mississippi